Gamasellus yosiianus is a species of mite in the family Ologamasidae.

References

yosiianus
Articles created by Qbugbot
Animals described in 1999